Tregaron Estate, formerly known as The Causeway, is a country house and estate located in the Cleveland Park neighborhood of Northwest, Washington, D.C.
The estate, built in 1912, was designed by architect Charles Adams Platt and landscape architect Ellen Biddle Shipman.
The original owners, Alice and James Parmelee, lived at the estate from the time of its construction until 1940.
From 1942 to 1958, it was occupied by Joseph E. Davies, who had served as United States ambassador to several countries, and his second wife, Post Cereal Company heiress Marjorie Merriweather Post.
Today the estate is occupied by a campus of the Washington International School and the Tregaron Conservancy.

Grounds 
In addition to the mansion, it includes a carriage house, greenhouse, gardener's residence, and a Russian-style dacha added by Ambassador and Mrs. Davies. The estate is notable for its varied architectural styles and landscape architecture by architect Charles A. Platt, who used the natural characteristics of the site in designing the estate. The mansion sits at the highest point of the grounds and provides views of the city to the south and the affluent Cleveland Park suburb to the north. Stone retaining walls line the driveway, which is carried by a large stone bridge over a small stream, "The Causeway", from which the property's original name was derived.

History 
The property, originally part of a larger estate, "Twin Oaks", was bought in 1888 by Gardiner Greene Hubbard, founder of the National Geographic Society, and named "The Causeway".  His daughter Mabel married Alexander Graham Bell and inherited the property, which she sold to James Parmelee, a Cleveland financier. Parmelee hired Charles Adams Platt to design a country house for the property. Platt employed Ellen Biddle Shipman as landscape architect for the project. 

After Parmelee's death, the estate was purchased in 1940 by Joseph E. Davies and his wife. Davies was the first chairman of the Federal Trade Commission; American ambassador to the Soviet Union (1936-1938); ambassador to Belgium and Luxembourg (1938-1939); a lawyer (1937 Law Firm:  Davies, Richberg, Beebe, Busick and Richardson); and special advisor to President Harry Truman and Secretary of State James Byrnes, with rank of ambassador at the Potsdam Conference.  Davies renamed the place "Tregaron" (the town of Saint Caron) after the town where his father, Edward Davies, was born in Ceredigion, Wales.

Attempts to develop the space were opposed by the "Friends of Tregaron", a community group. In 2006, an agreement was reached whereby  of the estate are to be conserved as open green space and managed by Tregaron Conservatory.

Architecture 

The mansion is a two-story brick building in the Georgian style. Renovations undertaken in 1941 by the Davies family included small additions to the service wing and other aesthetic improvements. Further revisions in the early 1980s were undertaken in order to convert the estate into a school. The dacha, added in 1945, provides a view of Washington National Cathedral. A farmhouse dating back to 1890 sits at the edge of the estate and was converted to office space for the International School. A schoolhouse building was constructed in 1988 and was designed to complement the existing buildings.

Filming location 
The Tregaron estate mansion was extensively used for both interior and exterior scenes in the 1962 film Advise and Consent and the 1993 film The Pelican Brief.

The humor coach scene in the 2006 film Borat was filmed in the Mansion (Room 205) of the Tregaron Campus. This room is usually used for Economics.

References

Sources
 (pdf), National Park Service. Retrieved September 10, 2010.

External links
The Tregaron Conservancy

Colonial Revival architecture in Washington, D.C.
Georgian Revival architecture in Washington, D.C.
Houses completed in 1912
Houses on the National Register of Historic Places in Washington, D.C.
1912 establishments in Washington, D.C.
Geography of Washington, D.C.
Parks in Washington, D.C.